Sillars is a surname. Notable people with the surname include:

 Donald Sillars (1868–1905), Scottish footballer
 Jim Sillars (born 1937), Scottish politician
 Agnes Sillars Hamilton (c.1794–1870, née Sillars), Scottish reformer, lecturer and phrenologist

Other uses
 Maxwell–Wagner–Sillars polarization